Arcadia is a 2012 novel by Lauren Groff published in 2012. It is set in Upstate New York during the 60s and 70s, and depicts a utopian commune through the eyes of the settlement's first-born child, Bit. The commune is situated on the grounds of an old and crumbling homestead. The book then splits storylines to depict a post-apocalyptic future ravaged by global warming. The novel received high praise from the New York Times, The Kenyon Review, NPR, and Guernica.

References

2012 American novels
Novels set in New York (state)
Novels by Lauren Groff
Post-apocalyptic novels
Hachette Books books